Chandrakant Bacchu Patil is an Indian politician and the Higher and technical education minister of Maharashtra state in the present Government of Maharashtra. Patil was the Maharashtra state President of Bharatiya Janata Party from 2019 to 2022. 

He is a member of the legislative assembly of Maharashtra and represents Kothrud Assembly constituency. Previously he was minister with portfolio of Revenue and Public Works Department and worked as the Guardian Minister of Kolhapur district, Sangli district and Pune district till 12 November 2019.

Early life and education
Patil was born on 10 June 1959 in the Jamnadas Prabhudas Chawl in Parel, Mumbai. His father, Bacchu Patil, used to serve tea to mill workers. He completed schooling from the Raja Shivaji Vidyalaya (formerly King George High School) in Dadar. He graduated from Siddharth College in Fort and graduated with a B.Com degree in 1985.

Political career

He was introduced to the Akhil Bharatiya Vidyarthi Parishad at the age of 18. In 1980, he started working as a full-time activist for the ABVP. 
In 1982, he was appointed the 'Pradesh Mantri'.  In 1985, Patil was elected as 'Kshetriya Sangathan Mantri' of the ABVP where he focused on the problems of the youth and student issues. 
In 1990, Dada Patil was elected as the Akhil Bharatiya Mantri of ABVP. At this time, he traveled to different districts of India to make people aware of social issues and addressed problems related to the education sector and the youth. In 2004, he joined the Bharatiya Janata Party and was elected as its Vice President in 2013. 
In June 2014, he was appointed a member of the Maharashtra Legislative Council. In October 2014, he was elected as Cabinet Minister of Maharashtra. He has been holding the Cabinet Minister's office since July 2016 and handling the revenue, relief & rehabilitation, and Public Works department.

References

External links
 Personal website

Members of the Maharashtra Legislative Council
State cabinet ministers of Maharashtra
Bharatiya Janata Party politicians from Maharashtra
1959 births
Living people
People from Pune
People from Karad
Maharashtra MLAs 2019–2024